Harman van den Berg (21 March 1918 – 6 August 2006) was a South African footballer who played as a midfielder.

References
LFC History profile

1918 births
2006 deaths
South African soccer players
Liverpool F.C. players
Sportspeople from Cape Town
Association football midfielders